"Reptilia" is a song by American rock band the Strokes. It was released as the second single from their second studio album, Room on Fire (2003) on February 9, 2004. The song was written by Julian Casablancas and produced by Gordon Raphael. In the US, it peaked at number 19 on the Modern Rock Tracks chart. It fared better in the UK, where it reached number 17 on the UK Singles Chart and was certified gold by the British Phonographic Industry (BPI). The single cover depicts an alien from the video game Centipede.

The single's B-side was "Modern Girls & Old Fashion Men", a duet between the band's lead singer Casablancas and Regina Spektor. The release of the single was delayed slightly after Casablancas objected to the song being credited as "the Strokes and Regina Spektor", claiming that it should read "Regina Spektor and The Strokes".

In October 2011, NME placed "Reptilia" at number 129 on its list "150 Best Tracks of the Past 15 Years". In 2020, The Independent and Paste ranked the song number seven and number six, respectively, on their lists of the 20 greatest Strokes songs.

The song has appeared in the video games Guitar Hero III: Legends of Rock, Guitar Hero Live, and Rock Band.

Music video
The music video for the song was their first that was not directed by Roman Coppola. Instead they chose Jake Scott to shoot the video, which features close shots of the band members' faces, hands, and instruments while performing the song. At the end of the video, Julian Casablancas spits at the camera lens.

Track listing

Charts

Certifications

References

External links
 
 

2003 songs
2004 singles
Garage punk songs
Songs written by Julian Casablancas
The Strokes songs
RCA Records singles